Nansha District and Nansha New Area is one of 11 urban districts and a state-level new area of the prefecture-level city of Guangzhou, the capital of Guangdong Province, China. It is the home of the present-day port of Guangzhou, as well as the Nansha Wetland Park.

The Nansha Technology Development Zone was carved out of Panyu District in 1993. In 2005, it was named Nansha District. In September 2012, Nansha was designated a State-level New Area as Nansha New Area, the sixth such area.

New area
Nansha is the newly established state-level new area (special economic and political administration zone) under the direct control of Guangzhou Municipal Government in September 2012.

In September 2012 Nansha New Area was approved by the State Council of China's Central Government as the sixth state-level new area (followed by Pudong of Shanghai, Binhai of Tianjin, Liangjiang of Chongqing, Zhoushan of Zhejiang, and Lanzhou New Area, Gansu), which is also the first state-level new development area in South Central China.

Geography 
Nansha District is located at the southernmost end of Guangzhou City, Guangdong Province, facing Dongguan City across the river in the east, bordering Zhongshan City and Shunde District in Foshan City in the west, connecting with Panyu District in Guangzhou City across the water with the Shawan Waterway as the boundary, and adjacent to Lingding, the outlet of the Pearl River in the south. Ocean, between 22°26′～23°06′ north latitude and 113°13′～113°43′ east longitude, with a total area of 803 square kilometers.

Administrative divisions

Transportation

Metro
Nansha is currently served by 2 metro lines operated by Guangzhou Metro:

 - Dongchong, Qingsheng, Huangge Auto Town, Huangge, Jiaomen, Jinzhou, Tangkeng, 
 - ,

References

External links

Official website of Nansha District government

 
Districts of Guangzhou